"My Love" is a song recorded by Canadian singer Celine Dion. Written and produced by Linda Perry and originally featured on Dion's tenth English studio album, Taking Chances (2007), it was released as the lead single from her greatest hits album, My Love: Essential Collection (2008). The song went to radio on 22 September 2008 and became available as a music download on the next day.

The pop ballad received mixed reviews from music critics. Some praised the song, calling it an "empowering" and gracious ballad. However, some critics noted that the song didn't offer anything new. The song had a moderate impact on the charts, entering the Canadian Hot 100 chart and Billboards Hot Adult Contemporary.

 Background, writing and release 
"My Love" was originally featured on Dion's ninth English studio album Taking Chances (2007). It was written and produced by Linda Perry, who also produced the song "New Dawn", also present on the album. The song was recorded live in Stockholm, Sweden, during the Taking Chances World Tour and included on her fourth greatest hits album My Love: Essential Collection (2008). In fact, the live version was released as the lead single from the compilation, going to radio on 22 September 2008 and became available as a music download on the next day. The physical two-track single was released on 20 October 2008 in the United Kingdom  and 31 October 2008 in Germany.

Critical reception
The song received mixed to favorable reviews from music critics. 
Sarah Rodman from The Boston Globe named it a "sky-scraping ballad," while Chuck Taylor from Billboard called it a "radio triumph" and "empowering". In the same vein, Ashante Infantry of Toronto Star wrote that the song is a "cringe-worthy diva track". Edna Gundersen of USA Today enjoyed the song, writing that Dion "shows admirable restraint and grace on My Love".

Tammy La Gorce from Amazon.com wrote that "As the subtle 'My Love' deftly proves, any early-career instincts to over-sing have gone poof along with her '90s-era, sweet-natured-kook persona". Sal Cinquemani from Slant Magazine wrote that Linda Perry "didn't offer anything of worth".

Commercial performance
"My Love" reached number nine on the Hungarian Singles Chart. The CD single was released in the United Kingdom with virtually no promotion surrounding it in the media, leading to its peak position at number 129 on the UK Singles Chart. The song did much better on the adult contemporary charts, peaking at number eight in Canada and number fifteen in the United States. On the Canadian Hot 100, "My Love" reached number 67.

Promotion
The live music video premiered on 25 September 2008. Dion performed "My Love" at the 43rd annual Jerry Lewis MDA Telethon via satellite from her Taking Chances World Tour. The telethon took place on 31 August 2008 and was simultaneously broadcast on television stations throughout the United States and Canada. On 28 October 2008 Dion performed the song also on The Oprah Winfrey Show and on 3 December 2008 on The Tonight Show with Jay Leno. The video of recording "My Love" in studio during the Taking Chances sessions was included on the Japan only released Ultimate Box (2008).

Track listing and formatsEuropean CD and digital single'
"My Love" (Radio Version) – 4:09
"My Love" (Live Version) – 5:04

Charts

Release history

References

2007 songs
2008 singles
2000s ballads
Celine Dion songs
Pop ballads
Songs written by Linda Perry